A number of steamships were named Riga, including:

, A Latvian cargo ship which sank in 1939
, A German cargo ship in service 1925–34

Ship names